Marie-Soleil Beaudoin (born 30 November 1982) is a Canadian soccer referee. She was named to the FIFA International list in 2014. She is also a professor of physiology and biophysics at Dalhousie University.

Early life and education
Beaudoin was born in 1982 in North Vancouver, before moving to Quebec City, Quebec as a toddler. She is the oldest of three daughters and began playing soccer at the age of five.

Beaudoin graduated from McGill University with a bachelor in science, minoring in education. She then attended the University of Guelph graduating with a masters in science and a PhD in nutrition, exercise and metabolism.

She worked as a professor at the University of Northern British Columbia for a year, before being hired as a professor of physiology and biophysics at Dalhousie University.

Refereeing career
Beaudoin received her regional badge in 2008, provincial status in 2009, national badge in 2013 and her FIFA badge in 2014. 

On 31 August 2018 Beaudoin was appointed to referee the 2018 FIFA U-17 Women's World Cup in Uruguay. Beaudoin would go on to referee the final of that tournament with Jamaican assistant referees Princess Brown and Stephanie-Dale Yee Sing. 

On 3 December 2018 FIFA announced that Beaudoin had been appointed to be an official in the 2019 FIFA Women's World Cup. After the conclusion of the round of 16, Beaudoin was retained as one of 11 officials to be assigned matches for the remainder of the tournament.

During the inaugural season of the Canadian Premier League, Beaudoin was assigned to officiate HFX Wanderers FC's home opener against Forge FC on 4 May 2019.

References

1982 births
Living people
Canadian soccer referees
Women association football referees
Place of birth missing (living people)
McGill University alumni
University of Guelph alumni
Academic staff of the University of Northern British Columbia
Academic staff of the Dalhousie University
FIFA Women's World Cup referees
Women referees and umpires